The Eritrean National Salvation Front (abbreviated ENSF; Italian: Fronte di Salvezza Nazionale Eritreo) is an Eritrean opposition group in-exile. The organisation had an armed wing which fought the Eritrean government, and a radio program that operates outside of Eritrea (as only state media is allowed in the country).

It was led by Ahmed Mohammed Nasser, an Eritrean multilingual secularist, until his death in March 2014. He was replaced by his longtime friend Dr. Habte Tesfamariam, who served as chairman until he died on January 13, 2017.

References

External links
 Official website
 ENSF Radio Program on Youtube

Guerrilla organizations
National liberation movements in Africa
Rebel groups in Eritrea
Rebel groups in Ethiopia
Eritrean National Salvation Front - Hidri (ENSF) social-democratic party led by Tuamezghi Teame